Darryl Laplante (born March 28, 1977) is a Canadian former professional ice hockey centre who played in 35 career National Hockey League games for the Detroit Red Wings. He is currently a non-competitive pond hockey player for the Steelhawks

Playing career
After three seasons in the Western Hockey League with the Moose Jaw Warriors, Laplante made his professional debut with Red Wings' AHL affiliate, the Adirondack Red Wings in the 1997–98 season.  He also appeared in two NHL games with Detroit that season.

Laplante spent the next two seasons in the Detroit organization. He was included on the 1998 Detroit Red Wings Stanley Cup winning picture, but left off cup (did not qualify).   He then was selected in the 2000 NHL Expansion Draft by the Minnesota Wild.  He never appeared in a game with the Wild, however, spending the 2000–01 season with the Wild's International Hockey League affiliate, the Cleveland Lumberjacks.

During the 2001–02 season, Laplante was traded to the Boston Bruins organization for Greg Crozier.  He finished the season with Boston's AHL team, the Providence Bruins.  He then spent three seasons in the ECHL, with his most recent professional season being 2003–04 with the Reading Royals.

Laplante cites his greatest professional achievement as being a 4-time non-competitive Lake Louise Pond Hockey Classic (LLPHC) champion.

Career statistics

External links

1977 births
Adirondack Red Wings players
Augusta Lynx players
Canadian ice hockey centres
Cincinnati Mighty Ducks players
Cleveland Lumberjacks players
Detroit Red Wings draft picks
Detroit Red Wings players
Houston Aeros (1994–2013) players
Ice hockey people from Calgary
Jackson Bandits players
Living people
Moose Jaw Warriors players
Providence Bruins players
Reading Royals players